Alexandru Ioniță may refer to:

 Alexandru Ioniță (footballer, born 1989), Romanian footballer
 Alexandru Ioniță (footballer, born 1994), Romanian footballer